Paul Edwin McGill III (born September 3, 1987) is an American actor, choreographer and director for stage, film, and television.

Performing career 
McGill made his Broadway debut when he was just a junior in high school in the 2004 revival of "La Cage aux Folles" (which won two Tony Awards). He was cast on the spot and replanted in New York that week. There, he attended the Professional Performing Arts School.

He then went on to play Mark in the Broadway revival of "A Chorus Line" for the entire run of the show at the Schoenfeld Theater. The cast performed on Good Morning America, the Tony Awards, and Dancing with the Stars, and most notably, the documentary Every Little Step.

During this time, McGill made his film debut in the BAFTA and Academy Award winning documentary Man On Wire, where he played Philippe Petit in the reenactments.

Shortly after the "A Chorus Line" closed, McGill moved to Los Angeles to star in the MGM remake of Fame (2009 film). He played Kevin, opposite Bebe Neuwirth. Their conversation causes his character to attempt suicide by stepping in front of a subway car. Later, Kevin tells Joy (Anna Maria Perez de Tagle) that he is moving back to Iowa, and that he is going to be "the best god damn dance teacher there ever was."

McGill then performed in the 2010 Tony Award winning musical, "Memphis", which is available on DVD.

From there, he performed in the controversial Broadway spectacular, "Spider-Man: Turn Off the Dark", playing Spider-Man, as well as Electro, Swarm, and the Lizard.

McGill then performed and was in the original cast recording of Woody Allen and Susan Stroman's, "Bullets Over Broadway".

His final performance was the "Bombshell" concert based on the fictitious musical on Smash produced by Craig Zadan and Neil Meron benefitting the Actors' Fund.

Filmography

Choreography and direction 
McGill was Associate Choreographer of the Broadway production of Hedwig and the Angry Inch starring Neil Patrick Harris, Andrew Rannells, Michael C Hall, John Cameron Mitchell, Darren Criss, and Taye Diggs. His job was to teach and tailor the choreography for each new Hedwig performer. Upon receiving an honorary Tony Award, the show's writer and original star, John Cameron Mitchell, publicly thanked Paul among other members of the creative team.

Shortly thereafter, McGill choreographed three  Off-Broadway plays in one season. The Legend of Georgia McBride, written by Matthew Lopez, directed by Mike Donahue, and produced by MCC Theater, played at the Lucille Lortel Theatre and at the Geffen Playhouse in Los Angeles in 2017. Following its success, He choreographed Steve, written by Marc Gerard, directed by Cynthia Nixon, and produced by the New Group at the Signature Theatre Company. The final play of the season, which he also associate directed, was The School for Scandal written by Richard Brinsley Sheridan, directed by Marc Vietor, and produced by the Red Bull Theater Company again at the Lucille Lortel Theatre.

Because of his flying experience in Spider-Man: Turn Off the Dark, McGill choreographed for the aerial dance company, Grounded Aerial, as well as Filament, a new circus work by Joseph Pinzon's company, Short-Round Productions. He has also choreographed the feature film called Diamond Soles, which has yet to be released.

In 2017, he trained Laverne Cox in Los Angeles for her role as Dr. Frank-N-Furter in The Rocky Horror Picture Show on Fox.

Broadway Masters 
In 2016, McGill started Broadway Masters with internet entrepreneur Marcus Lovingood. The program is an online streaming digital masterclass series bringing together Broadway stars and their advice on how to make it on Broadway. The first season of masterclasses include Taye Diggs, Anthony Rapp, Laura Osnes, Jon Rua, Courtney Reed, Charlotte D'Amboise, Nick Adams, Lindsay Mendez, Kurt Froman and McGill himself. The program was launched on November 10, 2016 to worldwide audiences.

References

External links 
 
 
 
  (archive)
 Broadway Masters official website

1987 births
American choreographers
Living people
Male actors from Pittsburgh